Demons and Wizards may refer to:

 Demons and Wizards (Uriah Heep album), by Uriah Heep
 Demons and Wizards (band), named after the album
 Demons and Wizards (Demons and Wizards album), (2000)